Lars Lindblad (born 1971) is a Swedish politician of the Moderate Party. He was  a member of the Riksdag from 1998 to 2010, and held the position as leader of the parliament group from 2006 to 2010 (Swedish title; Gruppledare för Riksdagsgruppen).

References

External links 
Riksdagen: Lars Lindblad (m)

Members of the Riksdag from the Moderate Party
Living people
1971 births
Members of the Riksdag 2002–2006